Malafronte is a surname. Notable people with the surname include:

Judith Malafronte, American opera singer
Luigi Malafronte (born 1978), Italian footballer